Wally Dallenbach Jr. (born May 23, 1963) is an American racing driver who formerly competed in the NASCAR Winston Cup Series. He competed in 226 Winston Cup races from 1991 to 2001 and had 23 top 10 finishes. The son of open wheel racer and former CART chief steward Wally Dallenbach Sr., Wally Jr. is also a road racer. Aside from NASCAR, Dallenbach has raced in SCCA Trans-Am, IMSA Camel GT, CART, and the Pikes Peak International Hill Climb.

Largely retired from full-time driving, Dallenbach was a race commentator for NBC Sports and Turner Sports. His primary responsibilities are for TNT's NASCAR coverage, a position he had held since 2001, and NBC Sports Network's IndyCar Series coverage, which he has been a part of since NBC was bought by Comcast in 2010 until 2014. Dallenbach worked with Adam Alexander and Kyle Petty on TNT and with Leigh Diffey and Jon Beekhuis on NBC Sports Network. In 2015 Dallenbach joined Fox NASCAR on NASCAR Race Hub.

Racing career

Early career
Dallenbach was born in Basalt, Colorado. He grew up in Denver with his father Wally Dallenbach Sr. and mother. After graduating high school, Dallenbach left Colorado for North Carolina to start a racing career. He began his pro racing career in the SCCA Trans-Am Series. Immediately he won the Rookie-of-the Year title in 1984, and followed that up with two Trans-Am championships. The first one in 1985 driving for Jack Roush in a Mercury Capri. This made Dallenbach the youngest Trans-Am champion at the age of just 22 years. The following year Dallenbach joined the Protofab team and drove their Camaros to another championship. The success garnered him an invitation to race in the International Race of Champions in 1987. Dallenbach followed up those accomplishments by winning the 24 Hours of Daytona four times and the 12 Hours of Sebring three times. He later drove in the GTO class of the IMSA GT championship, finishing runner-up in the standings in 1988 (driving for Jack Roush) and 1989.

IndyCar 
Initially, Dallenbach followed the steps of his father by pursuing an open-wheel career, taking part the inaugural round of the American Racing Series in 1986, on which he raced four more times over the following two seasons, finishing 3rd at Phoenix in 1988. One year before, he had made his CART Indy Car debut at Road America subbing for driver-owner Dick Simon, who had undergone an arm surgery after a fall off his motorbike. After qualifying 17th, Dallenbach went off the track late in the race and retired, though he was classified in the 12th and final points paying place. Three years later, in 1990, he took part in three road course races at the end of the season for the Leader Cards team, in place of the departing Pancho Carter, with an 11th place finish at Denver followed by engine failures at Mid-Ohio and Laguna Seca.

NASCAR
By 1991, Dallenbach was ready to make a jump to the world of NASCAR, racing in the Winston Cup Series. He made eleven starts that year driving one of Junie Donlavey's Fords.

In 1992, former boss Jack Roush called Dallenbach up to have him drive as a teammate to Mark Martin in the No. 16 Ford. He drove for Roush during the 1992 and 1993 seasons, finishing second at Watkins Glen 1993, fifth at the 1991 Watkins Glen race, seventh at 1996 Sonoma, and tenth at the 1993 Daytona 500 and 1993 Talladega 500.

In 1994, Richard Petty put Dallenbach in the famous No. 43 Pontiac. He was the second driver other than Petty to drive the No. 43. Dallenbach finished fourth at Sonoma, eighth at Talladega and tenth at Dover, but was released part way through the season. 1995 was an up-and-down year for Dallenbach, as he did not have a full-time ride. However, a one race deal with Bill Davis in the No. 22 Pontiac almost got Dallenbach his first Cup win at Watkins Glen, but he fell in the closing laps to finish in second.

The following years saw Dallenbach jumping around to different rides. He was considered one of the better road course drivers and was often recruited to drive at such tracks as Sonoma and Watkins Glen, as many drivers struggled on these more demanding tracks. In 1996 he drove the No. 15 Ford for Bud Moore Engineering, finishing sixth at the Daytona 500, third at Sonoma and tenth at Watkins Glen. Then he drove the No. 46 First Union-sponsored Chevrolet for Felix Sabates from 1997 through part of 1998, claiming a tenth-place finish at the 1997 Watkins Glen race.

Later in 1998, Dallenbach stepped in to sub for Ricky Craven in the No. 50 Chevrolet for Hendrick Motorsports. The combination worked out well, earning three top 10s, and Dallenbach signed on to drive the No. 25 Chevrolet for 1999. It resulted in his best position in the standings of eighteenth with six top tens.

In 2000, Dallenbach joined the new Galaxy Motorsports and drove the No. 75 Ford. It was a difficult season, with a best result of ninth at Watkins Glen. In addition, promised sponsor opportunities fell through, leaving Dallenbach without a ride right before the 2001 season was to begin. In fact, Dallenbach was listed in several season preview media sources, despite never attempting a single race that season. Dallenbach would also sub for Joe Nemechek in the Pocono event in 2001.

2021 

Dallenbach made his return to racing in 2021 in the Trans-Am TAH subcategory of the TA class.

Broadcasting career
Without a ride, Dallenbach took up TV commentating in 2001, covering the NASCAR races for NBC and TNT alongside Allen Bestwick (later Bill Weber, then Adam Alexander) and Benny Parsons (later Kyle Petty). In doing so, he became known for his pre-race "Wally's World" segment, where he takes celebrities for a ride around the track. The commentating also allowed Dallenbach to drive in a few Busch Series races and do some live commentary from the car. Dallenbach and Weber also teamed up to commentate several Championship Off-Road Racing events, with Dallenbach pre-running the track in a Pro-4 truck. With the NBC and TNT partnership splitting at the end of the 2006 season, Dallenbach stayed with TNT's new six-race package, and also reunited with Weber during NBC Champ Car broadcasts.

He has since run Daytona Prototypes with his brother Paul at the 24 Hours of Daytona and in 2006, won the open wheel division at the Pikes Peak International Hillclimb with Paul finishing right behind in 2nd. On September 22, 2014, Dallenbach announced he would return to Trans-Am for the season finale at Daytona in the TA2 class, stating the "broadcasting phase of my life is over".

Personal life
Dallenbach has been married to Robin Dallenbach, who is the daughter of drag racing driver, engine builder, and team owner Bob McCall. Their daughter Kate Dallenbach was a member of Richard Childress Racing's driver development program.

Motorsports career results

American open–wheel results 
(key) (Races in bold indicate pole position)

Complete CART Indy Car results

NASCAR
(key) (Bold – Pole position awarded by qualifying time. Italics – Pole position earned by points standings or practice time. * – Most laps led.)

Winston Cup Series

Daytona 500 results

Busch Series

Craftsman Truck Series

References

External links
 

1963 births
American color commentators
American television sports announcers
Champ Car drivers
Indy Lights drivers
International Race of Champions drivers
Living people
Motorsport announcers
NASCAR drivers
People from Basalt, Colorado
People from East Brunswick, New Jersey
Racing drivers from Colorado
Racing drivers from New Jersey
Sportspeople from the New York metropolitan area
Trans-Am Series drivers
Hendrick Motorsports drivers
RFK Racing drivers